Ardboe O'Donovan Rossa GAC is a club based in east County Tyrone, Northern Ireland, close to the shores of Lough Neagh. The club was formed in 1947 but Gaelic games had existed under different banners from the early 20th century.

The club has won a total of seven Tyrone Senior Football Championships, the last in 1998 when they defeated Omagh.

Michael Coney Park
Michael Coney Park is the home ground of Ardboe O'Donovan Rossa GAC, situated on the Kilmascally road near to the main parish centre.

In the 1970s the club constructed the main pavilion building and the surrounding facilities. In the following years new fencing was erected and a new covered stand and terracing to further improve the club's grounds.

In recent years the club purchased a new training field near the current playing field. Both pitches became Prunty pitches and floodlights were installed, permitting training during the winter months.

Achievements
 Tyrone Senior Football Championship (7) 
 1968, 1971, 1972, 1973, 1984, 1987, 1998
 Tyrone Intermediate Football Championship 
 1990
 Tyrone Junior Football Championship (2)
 1962, 1971

Notable Players
Brian McGuigan
Kyle Coney
Frank McGuigan 
Fay Devlin
Tommy McGuigan

Book references 
 Devlin, M. (1990) Ardboe O Donnovan Rossa: A History of GAA in Ardboe

External links 
 Ardboe O'Donovan Rossa GAC

Gaelic games clubs in County Tyrone
Gaelic football clubs in County Tyrone